The following units of the British, French and German Empires fought in the First Battle of the Marne from 5–12 September 1914 on the Western Front of World War I.

Comparative relevant military ranks

British Expeditionary Force

Commander-in-Chief of the BEF - Field-Marshal Sir John French
Chief of Staff - Lieutenant-General Sir Archibald Murray
Deputy Chief of Staff - Major-General Sir Henry Wilson 
Adjutant-General - Major-General Sir Nevil Macready
Quartermaster-General - Major-General Sir William Robertson
Deputy Adjutant-General - Major-General E. R. C. Graham
Commander, Royal Artillery - Major-General W. F. L. Lindsay
Commander, Royal Engineers - Brigadier-General G. H. Fowke
Assistant Adjutant-General - Colonel A. E. J. Cavendish
Assistant Quartermaster-General - Colonel C. T. Dawkins
Operations Officer - Colonel G. M. Harper
Intelligence Officer - Colonel G. M. W. Macdonogh

I Corps
General Officer Commanding - Lieutenant-General Sir Douglas Haig
Chief of Staff - Brigadier-General J. E. Gough
Commander, Royal Artillery - Brigadier-General H. S. Horne 
Commander, Royal Engineers - Brigadier-General S. R. Rice
1st Division - Major-General S. H. Lomax
1st (Guards) Brigade - Brigadier-General F. I. Maxse
1st Coldstream Guards
1st Scots Guards
1st The Black Watch (Royal Highlanders)
2nd The Royal Munster Fusiliers
2nd Infantry Brigade - Brigadier-General E. S. Bulfin
2nd The Royal Sussex Regiment
1st The Loyal North Lancashire Regiment
1st The Northamptonshire Regiment
2nd The King's Royal Rifle Corps
3rd Infantry Brigade - Brigadier-General H. J. S. Landon
1st The Queen's (Royal West Surrey Regiment)
1st The South Wales Borderers
1st The Gloucestershire Regiment
2nd The Welch Regiment
Artillery - Brigadier-General N. D. Findlay
XXV Brigade RFA
XXVI Brigade RFA
XXXIX Brigade RFA
XLIII (Howitzer) Brigade RFA
26th Heavy Battery, RGA
A Squadron, 15th (The King's) Hussars
23rd Field Company, RE
26th Field Company, RE
2nd Division - Major-General C. C. Monro
4th (Guards) Brigade - Brigadier-General Robert Scott-Kerr
2nd Grenadier Guards
2nd Coldstream Guards
3rd Coldstream Guards
1st Irish Guards
5th Infantry Brigade - Brigadier-General Richard Haking
2nd The Worcestershire Regiment
2nd The Oxfordshire and Buckinghamshire Light Infantry
2nd The Highland Light Infantry
2nd The Connaught Rangers
6th Infantry Brigade - Brigadier-General R. H. Davies
1st The King's (Liverpool Regiment)
2nd The South Staffordshire Regiment
1st Princess Charlotte of Wales's (Royal Berkshire Regiment)
1st The King's Royal Rifle Corps
Artillery - Brigadier-General E. M. Perceval
XXXIV Brigade RFA
XXXVI Brigade RFA
XLI Brigade RFA
XLIV (Howitzer) Brigade RFA
35th Heavy Battery, RGA
B Squadron, 15th (The King's) Hussars
5th Field Company, RE
11th Field Company, RE

II Corps
General Officer Commanding - Lieutenant-General Sir Horace Smith-Dorrien
Chief of Staff -  Brigadier-General George Forestier-Walker
Commander, Royal Artillery - Brigadier-General A. H. Short
Commander, Royal Engineers - Brigadier-General A. E. Sandbach
3rd Division - Major-General Hubert I. W. Hamilton
7th Infantry Brigade - Brigadier-General F. W. N. McCracken
3rd The Worcestershire Regiment
2nd The Prince of Wales's Volunteers (South Lancashire Regiment)
1st The Duke of Edinburgh's (Wiltshire Regiment)
2nd The Royal Irish Rifles
8th Infantry Brigade - Brigadier-General B. J. C. Doran
2nd The Royal Scots (Lothian Regiment)
2nd The Royal Irish Regiment
4th The Duke of Cambridge's Own (Middlesex Regiment)
1st The Gordon Highlanders
9th Infantry Brigade - Brigadier-General F. C. Shaw
1st The Northumberland Fusiliers
4th The Royal Fusiliers (City of London Regiment)
1st The Lincolnshire Regiment
1st The Royal Scots Fusiliers
Artillery - Brigadier-General F. D. V. Wing
XXIII Brigade RFA
XL Brigade RFA
XLII Brigade RFA
XXX (Howitzer) Brigade RFA
48th Heavy Battery, RGA
C Squadron, 15th (The King's) Hussars
56th Field Company, RE
57th Field Company, RE
5th Division - Major-General Sir Charles Fergusson
13th Infantry Brigade - Brigadier-General G. J. Cuthbert
2nd The King's Own Scottish Borderers
2nd The Duke of Wellington's (West Riding Regiment)
1st The Queen's Own (Royal West Kent Regiment)
2nd The King's Own (Yorkshire Light Infantry)
14th Infantry Brigade - Brigadier-General S. P. Rolt
2nd The Suffolk Regiment
1st The East Surrey Regiment
1st The Duke of Cornwall's Light Infantry
2nd The Manchester Regiment
15th Infantry Brigade - Brigadier-General A. E. W. Count Gleichen
1st The Norfolk Regiment
1st The Bedfordshire Regiment
1st The Cheshire Regiment
1st The Dorsetshire Regiment
Artillery - Brigadier-General J. E. W. Headlam
XV Brigade RFA
XXVII Brigade RFA
XXVIII Brigade RFA
VIII (Howitzer) Brigade RFA
108th Heavy Battery, RGA
A Squadron, 19th (Queen Alexandra's Own Royal) Hussars
17th Field Company, RE
59th Field Company, RE

III Corps
General Officer Commanding - Major-General W. P. Pulteney
Chief of Staff - Brigadier-General J. P. Du Cane
Commander, Royal Artillery - Brigadier-General E. J. Phipps-Hornby 
Commander, Royal Engineers - Brigadier-General F. M. Glubb
4th Division - Major-General T. D'O. Snow
10th Infantry Brigade - Brigadier-General J. A. L. Haldane
1st The Royal Warwickshire Regiment
2nd Seaforth Highlanders (Ross-shire Buffs, The Duke of Albany's)
1st Princess Victoria's (Royal Irish Fusiliers)
2nd The Royal Dublin Fusiliers
11th Infantry Brigade - Brigadier-General A. G. Hunter-Weston
1st Prince Albert's (Somerset Light Infantry)
1st The East Lancashire Regiment
1st The Hampshire Regiment
1st The Rifle Brigade (Prince Consort's Own)
12th Infantry Brigade - Brigadier-General H. F. M. Wilson
1st King's Own (Royal Lancaster Regiment)
2nd The Lancashire Fusiliers
2nd The Royal Inniskilling Fusiliers
2nd The Essex Regiment
Artillery - Brigadier-General G. F. Milne
XIV Brigade RFA
XXIX Brigade RFA
XXXII Brigade RFA
XXXVII (Howitzer) Brigade RFA
31st Heavy Battery, RGA
B Squadron, 19th (Queen Alexandra's Own Royal) Hussars
7th Field Company, RE
9th Field Company, RE
19th Infantry Brigade - Major-General L. G. Drummond
2nd The Royal Welch Fusiliers
1st The Cameronians (Scottish Rifles)
1st The Duke of Cambridge's Own (Middlesex Regiment)
2nd Princess Louise's (Argyll and Sutherland Highlanders)

1st Cavalry Division
Commanding Officer - Major-General Edmund Allenby
1st Cavalry Brigade - Brigadier-General C. J. Briggs
2nd Dragoon Guards (Queen's Bays)
5th (Princess Charlotte of Wales's) Dragoon Guards
11th (Prince Albert's Own) Hussars
2nd Cavalry Brigade - Brigadier-General H. de Lisle
4th (Royal Irish) Dragoon Guards
9th (Queen's Royal) Lancers
18th (Queen Mary's Own) Hussars
3rd Cavalry Brigade - Brigadier-General Hubert Gough
4th (Queen's Own) Hussars
5th (Royal Irish) Lancers
16th (The Queen's) Lancers
4th Cavalry Brigade - Brigadier-General Hon. C. E. Bingham
Household Cavalry Composite Regiment
6th Dragoon Guards (Carabiners)
3rd (King's Own) Hussars
Horse Artillery -  Brigadier-General B. F. Drake
III Brigade, Royal Horse Artillery
VII Brigade, Royal Horse Artillery
1st Field Squadron, RE

Army Troops

1st The Queen's Own Cameron Highlanders
1st The Devonshire Regiment
A Squadron, North Irish Horse
B Squadron, North Irish Horse
B Squadron, South Irish Horse
5th Cavalry Brigade - Brigadier-General Sir Philip Chetwode
2nd Dragoons (Royal Scots Greys)
12th (Prince of Wales's Royal) Lancers
20th Hussars
J Battery, RHA
4th Field Squadron, RE
Royal Garrison Artillery
No. 1 Siege Battery
No. 2 Siege Battery
No. 3 Siege Battery
No. 4 Siege Battery
No. 5 Siege Battery
No. 6 Siege Battery
Royal Flying Corps - Brigadier-General Sir David Henderson
2nd Aeroplane Squadron - Major C. J. Burke
3rd Aeroplane Squadron - Major John Salmond
4th Aeroplane Squadron - Major G. H. Rayleig
5th Aeroplane Squadron
6th Aeroplane Squadron - Major John Becke

French Armies

Generalissimo - Général d’Armée Joseph Joffre

Fifth Army
Commanding General - Général d’Armée Louis Franchet d'Espèrey

I Corps
Commanding General - Général de Corps d’Armée Henry Victor Deligny
1st Infantry Division - Général de Division Gallet
2nd Infantry Division - Général de Division Henry Victor Deligny, Colonel Noël Garnier-Duplessix (assumed command on 8 September)

III Corps
Commanding General - Général de Corps d’Armée Emile H. Hache
5th Infantry Division - Général de Brigade Charles Mangin
6th Infantry Division - Général de Brigade Philippe Pétain
37th Infantry Division - Général de Division Louis Comby

X Corps
Commanding General - Général de Corps d’Armée Gilbert Defforges
19th Infantry Division - Général de Division Gaëtan Bonnier
20th Infantry Division
51st Reserve Division - Général de Division René Boutegourd

XVIII Corps
Commanding General - Général de Corps d’Armée Louis de Maud'huy
35th Infantry Division - Général Charles Exelmans
36th Infantry Division
38th Infantry Division - Général de Division Paul J.H. Muteau

IV Reserve Division Group
Commanding General - Général de Division Mardochée Valabrègue
53rd Infantry Division - Général de Division Georges Perruchon, Général Journée 
69th Infantry Division - Général de Division Henri Le Gros

Conneau Cavalry Corps
Commanding General - Général de Corps d’Armée Louis Conneau
4th Cavalry Division
8th Cavalry Division - Général de Brigade Albert Baratier
10th Cavalry Division

Sixth Army
Commanding General - Général d’Armée Maunoury
Military Governor of Paris - Général d’Armée Joseph Gallieni
Chief of Staff - Général Guillemin

IV Corps
Commanding General - Général de Corps d’Armée Victor R. Boelle
7th Infantry Division - Général de Division Edgard de Trentinian
8th Infantry Division - Général de Division Raoul de Lartigue

VII Corps
Commanding General - Général de Corps d’Armée Frederic E. Vautier
14th Infantry Division - Général de Division Étienne de Villaret
63rd Reserve Division - Général de Division Georges Gustave Lombard

V Reserve Division Group
Commanding General - Général de Division Henri J.A.B. de Lamaze
55th Reserve Division - Général Loius Leguay
56th Reserve Division - Général de Brigade Théodore de Dartein

VI Reserve Division Group

61st Reserve Division
62nd Reserve Division - Général Marie F. Ganeval

Cavalry Corps Sordet/Bridoux
Commanding General - Général de Corps d’Armée André Sordet 
Commanding General - Général de Corps d’Armée Marie E. Bridoux  (assumed command on September 8)
1st Cavalry Division
3rd Cavalry Division
5th Cavalry Division

45th Infantry Division
Commanding Officer - Général Antoine M.B. Drude

Ninth ArmyCommanding General - Général d’Armée Ferdinand FochChief of Staff - Lieutenant-Colonel Weygand

IX CorpsGeneral Commanding - Général de Corps d’Armée Pierre Joseph Dubois17th Infantry Division - Général de Division Noël Jean-Baptiste Dumas18th Infantry Division - Général Justinien LefèvreMoroccan Division - Général de Division Georges Louis Humbert52nd Reserve Division - Général de Division Hyacinthe C.J. Coquet, Général de Brigade Jules A.W.L. Battesti (assumed command on September 6)

XI CorpsGeneral Commanding - Général de Corps d’Armée Joseph-Paul Eydoux21st Infantry Division - Général de Division Rene Radiguet22nd Infantry Division - Général de Division Joseph Maurice Pambet60th Reserve Division - Général de Division Maurice JoppéXXI CorpsGeneral Commanding - Général de Corps d’Armée Émile E. Legrand-Girarde13th Infantry Division - Général de Brigade Louis H.A. Baquet43rd Infantry Division - Général de Division Pierre E. Lanquetot9th Cavalry DivisionCommanding Officer - Général Jean de l'Espée42nd Infantry DivisionCommanding Officer - Général Paul François GrossettiGerman ArmiesChief of the Imperial German General Staff - Generaloberst Helmuth von MoltkeQuartermaster-General / Deputy Chief of Staff - General der Artillerie Hermann von Stein
Operations Officer - Oberst Gerhard Tappen
Political Officer - Oberst Wilhelm von Dommes
Intelligence Officer - Oberstleutnant Richard Hentsch

First ArmyCommanding General - Generaloberst Alexander von KluckChief of Staff - Generalmajor Hermann von Kuhl
Quartermaster-General - Oberst Walter von Bergmann

II CorpsCommanding General - General der Infantrie Alexander von LinsingenChief of Staff - Oberst Hans Freiherr von Hammerstein-Gesmold3rd Infantry Division - Generalleutnant Ferdinand K. von Trossel4th Infantry Division - Generalleutnant Günther von PannewitzIII CorpsCommanding General - General der Infanterie Ewald von LochowChief of Staff - Oberstleutnant Hans von Seeckt5th Infantry Division - Generalleutnant Georg Wichura6th Infantry Division - Generalmajor Richard Herhudt von RohdenIV CorpsCommanding General - General der Infanterie Friedrich Sixt von ArnimChief of Staff - Leo von Stocken7th Infantry Division - Generalleutnant Johannes Riedel8th Infantry Division - Generalleutnant Georg K.A. HildebrandtIX CorpsCommanding General - General der Infanterie Ferdinand von QuastChief of Staff - Oberstleutnant Franz Sydow17th Infantry Division - Generalleutnant Arnold von Bauer18th Infantry Division - Generalleutnant Max von KlugeIV Reserve CorpsCommanding General - General der Artillerie Hans von GronauChief of Staff - Oberstleutnant Friedrich von der Heyde7th Reserve Division - Generalleutnant Bogislav Graf von Schwerin22nd Reserve Division - Generalleutnant Otto RiemannII Cavalry CorpsCommanding General - General der Kavallerie Georg von der Marwitz2nd Cavalry Division - Generalleutnant Friedrich Freiherr von Krane4th Cavalry Division - Generalleutnant Otto von Garnier9th Cavalry Division - Generalmajor Eberhard Graf von SchmettowSecond ArmyCommanding General - Generaloberst Karl von BülowChief of Staff - Generalleutnant Ernst Otto von Lauenstein

Guards CorpsCommanding General - General der Infanterie Karl von PlettenbergChief of Staff - Oberstleutnant Friedrich Graf von der Schulenburg1st Guards Infantry Division - Generalleutnant Oskar von Hutier2nd Guards Infantry Division - Generalleutnant Arnold von WincklerVII CorpsCommanding General - General der Kavallerie Karl von EinemChief of Staff - Oberst Hans von Wolff13th Infantry Division - Generalleutnant Kurt von dem Borne14th Infantry Division - Generalleutnant Friedrich FleckX CorpsCommanding General - General der Infanterie Otto von EmmichChief of Staff - Oberst Gustav Freiherr von der Wenge Graf von Lambsdorff19th Infantry Division - Generalleutnant Max P.O. Hofmann 20th Infantry Division - Generalleutnant Alwin SchmundtX Reserve CorpsCommanding General - General der Infanterie Johannes von EbenChief of Staff - Oberstleutnant Max Hoffmann von Waldau2nd Guards Reserve Division - Generalleutnant Richard Freiherr von Süsskind-Schwendi19th Reserve Division - General der Infanterie Max von BahrfeldtI Cavalry CorpsCommanding General - Generalleutnant Manfred von RichthofenGuards Cavalry Division - Generalleutnant Adolph von Storch5th Cavalry Division - Generalleutnant Karl von IlsemannThird ArmyCommanding General - Generaloberst Max Freiherr von HausenChief of Staff - Generalmajor Ernst von Hoeppner
Quartermaster-General - Generalmajor von Leuthold
Chief Engineer - Generalmajor Franz Adams

XII (1st Royal Saxon) CorpsCommanding General - General der Infanterie Karl d'ElsaChief of Staff - Oberstleutnant von Eulitz23rd Infantry Division45th Brigade
100th Life-Grenadiers
101st Grenadiers
46th Brigade
108th Schützen
182nd Infantry
23rd Field Artillery Brigade
12th Field Artillery
48th Field Artillery
20th Hussars
1st Company, 12th Pioneer Btln.32nd Infantry Division63rd Brigade
102nd Infantry
103rd Infantry
12th Jäger Btln.
64th Brigade
177th Infantry
178th Infantry
32nd Field Artillery Brigade
28th Field Artillery
64th Field Artillery
18th Hussars
2nd Company, 12th Pioneer Btln.
3rd Company, 12th Pioneer Btln.
1st Btln., 19th Field Artillery
29th Aviation Detachment

XIX (2nd Royal Saxon) CorpsCommanding General - General der Kavallerie Maximilian von Laffert Chief of Staff - Oberstleutnant Frotscher24th Infantry Division47th Brigade
139th Infantry
179th Infantry
13th Jäger Btln.
48th Brigade
106th Infantry
107th Infantry
24th Field Artillery Brigade
76th Field Artillery
77th Field Artillery
18th Uhlans
1st Company, 22nd Pioneer Btln.40th Infantry Division88th Brigade
104th Infantry
181st Infantry
89th Brigade
133rd Infantry
134th Infantry
40th Field Artillery Brigade
32nd Field Artillery
68th Field Artillery
19th Hussars
2nd Company, 22nd Pioneer Btln.
3rd Company, 22nd Pioneer Btln.
2nd Btln., 19th Field Artillery
24th Aviation Detachment

XII (Royal Saxon) Reserve CorpsCommanding General - General der Artillerie Hans von KirchbachChief of Staff - Oberstleutnant von Koppenfels23rd Reserve Division45th Reserve Brigade
100th Reserve Infantry
101st Reserve Infantry
12th Reserve Jäger Btln.
46th Reserve Brigade
102nd Reserve Infantry
103rd Reserve Infantry
23rd Reserve Field Artillery
Saxon Reserve Hussars
4th Company, 12th Reserve Pioneer Btln.24th Reserve Division'47th Reserve Brigade
104th Reserve Infantry
106th Reserve Infantry
13th Reserve Jäger Btln.
48th Reserve Brigade
107th Reserve Infantry
133rd Reserve Infantry
24th Reserve Field Artillery
Saxon Reserve Uhlans
1st Company, 12th Reserve Pioneer Btln.
2nd Company, 12th Reserve Pioneer Btln.

Army Troops

3rd (Mortar) Btln., 19th Field Artillery
23rd Pioneers
22nd Aviation Detachment
47th Mixed Landwehr Brigade
104th Landwehr Infantry
106th Landwehr Infantry
2nd Landwehr Cavalry Squadron
Landwehr Artillery Battery

See also
British Expeditionary Force order of battle (1914)

References

Sources
 Ian Sumner "The First Battle of the Marne 1914" Osprey Publishing (May 25, 2010) 
 Asprey R. B. The First Battle of the Marne W&N 1962
 Cassar, George. Kitchener's War: British Strategy from 1914 to 1916. Brassey's Inc. Washington 2004. 
 Evans, M. M. (2004). Battles of World War I. Select Editions. .
 Isselin, Henri. The Battle of the Marne. London: Elek Books, 1965. (Translation of La Bataille de la Marne, published by Editions B. Arthaud, 1964.)
 Michelin Guide The Marne Battle-Fields (1914) 1925
 Perris, George Herbert. The Battle of the Marne. London: Methuen, 1920.
 Porch, Douglas. The March to the Marne: The French Army, 1870–1914 (Cambridge, 1981 / 2003).
 Tuchman, Barbara. The Guns of August. New York: The Macmillan Company, 1962.
 von Hausen, Max. Erinnerungen an den Marnefeldzug 1914''. (Translation: "Reminiscences of the Marne Campaign 1914") Dresden: K.F. Koehler, 1920.

World War I orders of battle